The MiG Operational Flying Training Unit or MOFTU is a unit of the Indian Air Force. It was formed on 15 December 1986 at Tezpur to impart Stage 3 training on the Mikoyan-Gurevich MiG-21 fighter aircraft.

The primary role of the unit is to provide operational flying training to pilots inducted into the fighter stream. MOFTU is the largest fighter-flying establishment in the Indian Air Force and consists of two squadrons, namely Alpha and Bravo.

References 

Indian Air Force
Military units and formations established in 1986
1986 establishments in Assam